Buzzard Run may refer to:

Buzzard Run (Missouri), a stream in Missouri
Buzzard Run (Lynncamp Run), a stream in West Virginia